Winfield is a rural locality in the Bundaberg Region, Queensland, Australia.

Geography 
Baffle Creek forms the northern boundary.

History 
Winfield State School opened on 4 March 1924.

Education 
Winfield State School is a government primary (Early Childhood-6) school at 1091 Winfield Road. In 2013, there were 16 students enrolled, but, by August 2017, there were no students and no prospect of new enrolments in the coming years. The changing demographics of the area had seen an increase in retirees and tourists but a loss of young families with school-aged children due to a lack of local jobs. The school is expected to be permanently closed, but, as at 2022, the school remains mothballed.

There are no secondary schools in Winfield. The nearest government primary and secondary school is Rosedale State School in neighbouring Rosedale to the south-west.

Amenities 
There is a boat ramp on Rocky Point Road on the south bank of Baffle Creek. It is managed by the Bundaberg Regional Council.

References

Further reading 

 

Bundaberg Region
Localities in Queensland